SISC is an R5RS Scheme implementation, which includes a full number tower, hygienic macros, proper tail recursion, and first class continuations. SISC is short for Second Interpreter of Scheme Code, in reference to its predecessor LISC, the Lightweight Interpreter of Scheme Code.

SISC is free software, dual-licensed under the Mozilla Public License and the GNU General Public License, Version 2. It was developed by Scott G. Miller and Matthias Radestock.

Features
SISC depends on Sun Microsystems' Java programming language platform. This runtime environment allows SISC to provide many extensions and libraries such as networking, exception handling, a module system, and a Java foreign function interface.

The SISC website claims that it performs faster than any other Scheme interpreter based on the Java Virtual Machine (JVM).

Like GNU Guile, this Scheme is suitable for embedding into larger programs, where Guile is designed for inclusion in C programs, SISC is designed for the JVM.

References

Scheme (programming language) implementations
Scheme (programming language) interpreters
JVM programming languages
Software using the Mozilla license